Pierre-Buffière is a commune in the Haute-Vienne department in the Nouvelle-Aquitaine region in west-central France. Inhabitants are known as Pierre-Buffiérois.

Geography
The village lies on the left bank of the Briance, which flows westward through the northern part of the commune. Pierre-Buffière station has rail connections to Brive-la-Gaillarde and Limoges.

Gallery

See also
Communes of the Haute-Vienne department

References

Communes of Haute-Vienne